Heidemarie Fuentes is an American actress and producer.

Fuentes is best known for such films as Hey DJ, Opie Gets Laid, Mrs. Harris and La Femme Vampir.

References

External links
 
 
 Heidemarie Fuentes on Myspace
 

American film producers
American film actresses
American television actresses
German emigrants to the United States
Living people
Year of birth missing (living people)
American women film producers
21st-century American women